The Inner Scar is a 1972 French film directed by Philippe Garrel, who co-stars with Nico, her son Christian (Ari) and Pierre Clémenti. It was filmed in Egypt, the United States and Iceland. The film features five songs written and performed by Nico: "Abschied", "Janitor of Lunacy", "My Only Child", "All That Is My Own" and "König". Originally released in 1972, it was re-released in 2005. In 2011, it was released on DVD paired with Garrel's 1983 film Liberté, la nuit. French film archivist Henri Langlois called the film a "masterpiece".

References

External links
 
 

1972 films
French musical fantasy films
Films directed by Philippe Garrel
Films shot in Egypt
Films shot in Iceland